HNLMS Jacob van Heemskerck was the second and last of the  light cruisers of the Royal Netherlands Navy, named after Admiral Jacob van Heemskerk (1567–1607).

Originally designated as a flotilla leader and a torpedo cruiser in Decker's Fleet Plan of 1931, she was hastily commissioned on 10 May 1940, when Germany invaded the Netherlands. However, as she was not armed she escaped to the United Kingdom, where she was refitted as an air defence cruiser, since these were the only type of gun available, and there was a growing need for this type of ship to protect the convoys. During the Second World War the crew felt that their ship was blessed and gave her the nickname Oude Jacob (Old Jacob). She received the reputation for proficiency, and not a single convoy ship would be lost when she was on duty.

Service history
The ship was meant to commence trials on the day the Germans invaded, and to prevent her capture the Heemskerck was immediately pressed into service. Since she had no armament she left port for the United Kingdom with only a skeleton crew. Once she had arrived in Portsmouth attempts were made to give her weaponry of some sort. She received depth charge equipment from the old torpedo boats G13 and G15. On 18 May 1940, Queen Wilhelmina paid the ship a visit. At the end of the month, Heemskerck and the cruiser  received the assignment to transport Princess Juliana and her two children (including the later Beatrix of the Netherlands) to Canada. The ships put to sea on 2 June and arrived on 11 June at Halifax.

Heemskerck returned alone to England and arrived at Portsmouth in July where her re-arming programme began. The British Admiralty decided to convert her to an anti-aircraft ship. Work was completed on 17 February 1941, and after sea trials, which lasted till 29 February, the ship was assigned as a convoy escort in the Atlantic Ocean as part of the Irish Sea Escort.

She was removed from escort duty in January 1942 and sent to the Dutch East Indies to reinforce the defence fleet assembled there. The ship arrived too late to take part in the battle of the Java Sea and was reassigned to the Eastern Fleet in 1942. In September 1942 the ship took part in operations 'Stream' and 'Jane', both aimed at the retaking of Madagascar. On 25 October Heemskerck arrived at Fremantle, Australia, and came under the command of Allied Naval Forces Western Australia, where she performed convoy duties.

On 28 November 1942, Heemskerck, in the company of the Australian cruiser , identified and damaged the German supply vessel and blockade runner Ramses, which was subsequently scuttled by her own crew in the Indian Ocean.

On 1 December 1943, the ship returned to the Eastern Fleet and on 27 December, she set sail for the Mediterranean Sea where she, again, performed convoy duties till she was recalled to England for maintenance in June 1944.

On 26 July 1945 Jacob van Heemskerck arrived at Amsterdam, the first Dutch warship to do so after Liberation Day. In September of that year she set sail for the Dutch East Indies, where she performed patrol duties until 22 July 1946. She returned to the Netherlands in August of that year.

Post-war
From 12 March 1951 she served as a barracks ship for naval trainees in Vlissingen. She served in this capacity in several other locations. The cruiser was decommissioned on 20 November 1969, and was struck from the Naval Registry on 27 February 1970. On 23 June 1970 the ship was sold for scrap.

Notes

Footnotes

Citations

References
 

 
 

Ships built by Nederlandsche Scheepsbouw Maatschappij
1939 ships
World War II cruisers of the Netherlands
Cold War cruisers of the Netherlands
Tromp-class cruisers